The African Qualification Tournament for the 2020 Men's Olympic Volleyball Tournament was a volleyball tournament for men's national teams held in Cairo, Egypt from 7 to 11 January 2020. 5 teams played in the tournament and the winners Tunisia qualified for the 2020 Summer Olympics.

Qualification
Seven CAVB national teams which had not yet qualified to the 2020 Summer Olympics entered qualification. But, Botswana and Niger later withdrew. In addition, Ghana were disqualified for not arriving in Cairo until just before the beginning of the tournament. All of Ghana's matches were forfeited and Ghana were ranked in last place in the final standing.

 (withdrew)

 (Disqualified)
 (withdrew)

Venue
 Cairo Stadium Indoor Hall 2, Cairo, Egypt

Pool standing procedure
 Number of matches won
 Match points
 Sets ratio
 Points ratio
 Result of the last match between the tied teams

Match won 3–0 or 3–1: 3 match points for the winner, 0 match points for the loser
Match won 3–2: 2 match points for the winner, 1 match point for the loser

Round robin
All times are Egypt Standard Time (UTC+02:00).
Ghana's forfeited matches (25–0, 25–0, 25–0) were not recorded and excluded from the ranking calculation.

|}

|}

Final standing

Qualifying team for Summer Olympics

See also
Volleyball at the 2020 Summer Olympics – Women's African qualification

References

External links
Official website – FIVB
Final Standing

2020 in volleyball
Volleyball qualification for the 2020 Summer Olympics
2020 in Egyptian sport
Sports competitions in Cairo
International volleyball competitions hosted by Egypt
January 2020 sports events in Africa